The Roman Catholic Diocese of Bambari is a suffragan Latin Rite diocese in Bambari in the Ecclesiastical province of Bangui, which covers the Central African Republic, yet depends on the missionary Roman Congregation for the Evangelization of Peoples.

Its cathedral and episcopal see is Cathédrale Saint Joseph, dedicated to Saint Joseph, in Bambari, Ouaka.

History 
Established on December 18, 1965, as Diocese of Bambari, on territory split off from its Metropolitan, the Archdiocese of Bangui.

Statistics 
As per 2014, it pastorally served 104,129 Catholics (24.2% of 429,755 total) on 173,000 km² in 14 parishes and 4 missions with 25 priests (23 diocesan, 2 religious), 22 lay religious (2 brothers, 20 sisters) and 7 seminarians.

Bishops
(all Roman Rite)

Apostolic Administrators 

 Apostolic administrator Joachim N’Dayen (1970–1978) while Metropolitan Archbishop of Bangui (Central African Republic) (September 16, 1970  – July 26, 2003), President of Central African Episcopal Conference (1970 – 1997), later President of Association of Episcopal Conferences of the Central Africa Region (1989 – 1994); previously Titular Archbishop of Culusi (September 5, 1968  – September 16, 1970) as Coadjutor Archbishop of Bangui (September 5, 1968 – succession September 16, 1970)
 Apostolic Administrator Father Michel Marie Joseph Maître, Spiritans (C.S.Sp.) (born France) (1978 – June 19, 1981 see below)

Bishops
 Michel Marie Joseph Maître, C.S.Sp. (see above June 19, 1981 – death February 20, 1996)
 Jean-Claude Rembanga (February 29, 1996 – retired November 6, 2004)
 Édouard Mathos (November 6, 2004 – died April 28, 2017), also President of Central African Episcopal Conference (February 2010 – July 2013); previously Titular Bishop of Giufi (August 28, 1987  – November 6, 2004), first as Auxiliary Bishop of Diocese of Bossangoa (Central African Republic) (August 28, 1987  – January 26, 1991), then as Auxiliary Bishop of Archdiocese of Bangui (Central African Republic (January 26, 1991  – November 6, 2004)
 Bertrand Guy Richard Appora-Ngalanibé, Dominican Order (O.P.) (April 28, 2017 - ...), succeeding as previous coadjutor-bishop (December 10, 2016 – April 28, 2017)

Coadjutor bishops
Jean-Claude Rembanga (1995-1996)
Bertrand Guy Richard Appora-Ngalanibé, O.P. (2016-2017)

See also 
 List of Catholic dioceses in the Central African Republic
 Roman Catholicism in the Central African Republic

Sources and external links 
 GCatholic.org
 

Roman Catholic dioceses in the Central African Republic
Roman Catholic Ecclesiastical Province of Bangui
Religious organizations established in 1909
Roman Catholic dioceses and prelatures established in the 20th century
Ouaka